Udënisht (also: Hudënisht) is a village and a former municipality in the Korçë County, southeastern Albania. At the 2015 local government reform it became a subdivision of the municipality Pogradec. The population at the 2011 census was 5,990. The municipal unit consists of the villages Udënisht, Mëmëlisht, Çervenakë, Piskupat, Lin and Buqez.

References

Former municipalities in Korçë County
Administrative units of Pogradec
Villages in Korçë County